Katherine Revell Valli (born 16 January 2003) is an American para badminton player who competes in international level events. She was a double medalist at the 2019 BWF Para-Badminton World Championships in Basel.

Achievements

World Championships 

Women's singles

Women's doubles

Pan Am Championships 
Women's singles

Women's doubles

International Tournaments (5 titles, 7 runners-up) 
Women's singles

Women's doubles

Doubles

Mixed doubles

References

Notes 

Living people
Sportspeople from Pittsburgh
People from Edgeworth, Pennsylvania
People from Sewickley, Pennsylvania
American female badminton players
2003 births
American para-badminton players
21st-century American women